Pocking is a town in the district of Passau, in Lower Bavaria, Germany. It is situated about 30 km south-west of Passau, close to the Austrian border.

History
A Roman settlement was founded in the area of Pocking as early as the 1st century AD. The Bajuwaren tribe settled around Pocking in the 6th century AD. In 820 AD Pocking was first mentioned in a historic document.
Since 1824 Pocking forms its own political community and in 1971 it was granted the privileges of a town.

During the Nazi regime a side camp of the Flossenbürg concentration camp was set up in Pocking.
After World War II the second largest DP camp ("displaced persons") in Germany was located in Pocking. In 1946 the camp housed 7,645 people, mostly of Jewish heritage. It was disbanded in 1949.

The Rottal area to which Pocking belongs is famous for its horse breeding. That is also why the coat of arms of Pocking includes the head of a horse. The other symbols relate to the history of the town and the different villages that formed the political community of Pocking.

Mayors
Since the election in 2008 Franz Krah (Independent citizens) is the mayor of Pocking. His predecessor was Josef Jakob (CSU). Krah was reelected in March 2014 with 82.01% of the votes.

Solarpark

In April 2006, Pocking Solar Park, the at this time  world's largest connected solar power plant, was opened in Pocking. The plant produces 10 megawatt peak, has 62,500 photovoltaic cells and cost approximately 40 million euros.

Education

Schools include:
Wilhelm-Diess-Gymnasium

Sons and daughters of the town
 Michael Ammermüller (born 1986), race car driver

References

External links
  

Passau (district)